Roman cursive (or Latin cursive) is a form of handwriting (or a script) used in ancient Rome and to some extent into the Middle Ages. It is customarily divided into old (or ancient) cursive and new cursive.

Old Roman cursive 

Old Roman cursive, also called majuscule cursive and capitalis cursive, was the everyday form of handwriting used for writing letters, by merchants writing business accounts, by schoolchildren learning the Latin alphabet, and even by emperors issuing commands. A more formal style of writing was based on Roman square capitals, but cursive was used for quicker, informal writing. Most inscriptions at Pompeii, conserved due to being buried in a volcanic eruption in 79 CE, are written in this script.

It is most commonly attested from the 1st century BCE to the 3rd century CE, but it likely existed earlier than that.  The script uses many ligatures (see, e.g., Tironian notes), and some letters are hard to recognize – "a" looks like an uncial "a", but with the left stroke still straight, "b" and "d" are hard to distinguish, "e" is a full height letter (like the "s"), "p" and "t" are very similar, and "v" is written above the baseline, resembling a floating breve.

New Roman cursive 

New Roman cursive, also called minuscule cursive or later Roman cursive, developed from old Roman cursive. It was used from approximately the 3rd century to the 7th century, and uses letterforms that are more recognizable to modern readers: "a", "b", "d", and "e" have taken a more familiar shape, and the other letters are proportionate to each other rather than varying wildly in size and placement on the line.

These letter forms would gradually evolve into various scripts with a more regional character by the 7th century, such as the Visigothic script in Spain, the Beneventan script in southern Italy, or the Merovingian script in northern France. They also formed part of the basis of the uncial and half-uncial scripts, particularly for the letters "a", "g", "r", and "s".

See also 
 Chamalières tablet
 Demotic (Egyptian)
 Hieratic
 Larzac tablet
 Vindolanda tablets

Notes

References 
 Jan-Olaf Tjäder, Die nichtliterarischen lateinischen Papyri Italiens aus der Zeit 445–700 (Lund, 1955).
 Vindolanda Tablets on line, Centre for the Study of Ancient Documents and the Academic Computing Development Team at Oxford University.

Further reading 
 'Manual of Latin Palaeography' (A comprehensive PDF file containing 82 pages profusely illustrated, June 2014).
 Latin cursive presented by the University of Michigan Papyrus Collection
 Vindolanda: Roman documents discovered, Current Archaeology, a World Wide Web article, based on a fuller accounts in Current Archaeology Nos. 116, 128. 132 and 153.

Latin language in ancient Rome
Latin-script calligraphy
Penmanship
Palaeography
Western calligraphy

de:Römische Kursive